35th Battalion may refer to:

 35th Battalion (Australia), a unit of the Australian Army that served during World War I and II
 35th Battalion (New Zealand), a unit of the New Zealand Military Forces during World War II
 35th Battalion, CEF, a unit of the Canadian Expeditionary Force during World War I
 35th Battalion Virginia Cavalry
 35th Signal Battalion (United States)

See also
 35th Division (disambiguation)
 35th Regiment (disambiguation)
 35th Squadron (disambiguation)